The English School attached to Guangdong University of Foreign Studies is a boarding school founded in 1993 in Baiyun District, Guangzhou, China.  It has 5300 students and 730 teaching members of staff across 60 elementary school classes and 76 middle school classes.

The school uses English orientated teaching and provides English classes with foreign teachers.

Sister Schools 
Hangzhou Foreign Language School: http://www.chinahw.net/html_en/template/aboutus.html

References 

Education in Guangzhou
Educational institutions established in 1993
Boarding schools in China
1993 establishments in China